Bercy is a station on Line 6 and Line 14 of the Paris Métro. It is located at the intersection of the Boulevard de Bercy and the Rue de Bercy in the neighbourhood of Bercy in the 12th arrondissement.

History
The station opened on 1 March 1909 with the opening of the original section of Line 6 from Place d'Italie to Nation (although part of Line 5—some dating back to 2 October 1900—was incorporated into Line 6 on 12 October 1942).

The Line 14 platforms opened on 15 October 1998 as part of the original section of the line from Madeleine to Bibliothèque François Mitterrand. It is named after the streets it is situated in and the neighbourhood of Bercy, which is mentioned in a document written in 1134. Over the centuries the lords of Bercy built a castle there which eventually covered a third of the commune of Bercy, which was absorbed into Paris in 1860. It was the location of the Barrière de Bercy, a gate built for the collection of taxation as part of the Wall of the Farmers-General; the gate was built between 1784 and 1788 and demolished in the 19th century.

From 1972 to 1974, during the pneumatisation of Line 6, the Gare de Paris Bercy, located south of the station, was used to carry out this work. West of Bercy station on Line 6 is the Pont de Bercy, which the line uses to cross the Seine towards the Rive Gauche.

On 16 July 2018, several name signs of the station are temporarily replaced to celebrate the victory of the France national football team at the 2018 FIFA World Cup, as in five other stations. Bercy was humorously renamed Bercy les Bleus (for "Merci les Bleus") as a thank you to the players of the French team.

Passenger services

Access
The station has several exits:
 Access 1, "Bercy Arena": two stairs and an elevator Place du Bataillon-du-Pacifique;
 Access 2, "Rue Corbineau": a staircase at 48, Boulevard de Bercy;
 Access 3, "Gare de Bercy": a fixed staircase on the Rue de Bercy, odd side and two fixed stairs each lined with an escalator on the even side.

Station layout

Platforms
The platforms of the two lines are of standard configuration. Two per stopping point, they are separated by the metro tracks located in the centre. A connection connects the two tunnels, between the track direction Mairie de Saint-Ouen of Line 14 and the track direction Étoile of Line 6.

Line 6 station has an elliptical vault. The decoration is of the style used for most Métro stations, bevelled white ceramic tiles cover the walls, vault and tympanums, while lighting is provided by two tube-canopies. The advertising frames are metallic; the name of the station is inscribed in Parisine font on enamelled plaques. The platforms are equipped with wooden slatted benches.

The architecture of the station of Line 14 follows the principles defined by Bernard Kohn for the whole of Line 14 since 1991, both in the choice of materials (light concrete ceilings, wood on the walls, floor tiles) and for lighting and ceiling height. The platforms are also wider than those of the other lines. The name of the station is written in Parisine font on backlit panels embedded in the walls and on stickers affixed to the platform facades.

Nearby
 Accor Arena (formerly Palais Omnisports de Paris-Bercy or POPB), a major sports arena, is located to the south of Bercy station.
 The Ministry of the Economy and Finance (Ministère de l'Économie et des Finances), also known simply as "Bercy", is located to the west of Bercy station.
 The Gare de Bercy, serving medium-distance domestic services to Avallon via , Sens and Auxerre.
 The Parc de Bercy (north entrance), also served by Cour Saint-Émilion (south entrance).

Gallery

Notes

References
Roland, Gérard (2003). Stations de métro. D’Abbesses à Wagram. Éditions Bonneton.

Accessible Paris Métro stations
Paris Métro stations in the 12th arrondissement of Paris
Railway stations in France opened in 1909